The Great Lakes Valley Conference (GLVC) men's basketball tournament is the annual conference basketball championship tournament for the Great Lakes Valley Conference. The tournament has been held since 1998, twenty years after the conference was founded in 1978. It is a single-elimination tournament and seeding is based on regular season records.

The tournament bracket has included as few as seven teams and as many as fifteen. The most common format has featured eight teams competing at a predesignated neutral site. In 1998, 2008, 2009, and 2021, the quarterfinals were played on campus sites and the final four was held on the home court of the highest seed surviving the quarterfinals.

The tournament winner is conference champion and receives the GLVC's automatic bid to the NCAA Division II men's basketball tournament.

Former members Kentucky Wesleyan and Bellarmine have won the most tournaments, with five apiece.

Results

Championship records

 Illinois–Springfield, Maryville, Missouri S&T, Rockhurst, Southwest Baptist, and William Jewell have not yet reached the finals of the GLVC tournament.
 Lindenwood, IPFW, and SIU Edwardsville never reached the tournament finals before departing the GLVC.
 Schools highlighted in pink are former GLVC members.

See also
 Great Lakes Valley Conference women's basketball tournament

References

NCAA Division II men's basketball conference tournaments
Basketball Tournament, Men's
Recurring sporting events established in 1998